Trishagni (English: The Sand Storm) is a 1988 Hindi film directed by Nabendu Ghosh. The film was based on a historical short story set some time after the Asokan Missions, Moru O Sangho written by Saradindu Bandopadhyay, and inspired by Buddha's Fire Sermon, and starred Nana Patekar, Nitish Bharadwaj, Pallavi Joshi and Alok Nath in the lead roles.

The film received critical acclaim, and was awarded the 1988 National Film Award for Best First Film of a Director, "For excellent exploration of complex philosophical theme for the first time in Indian cinema.".

Synopsis
The film is set in the Buddhist town of Sariput in the deserts of Central Asia, around 200 B.C., when the town is struck by a devastating sandstorm that leaves behind only four survivors: two monks, and two children taking refuge in the monastery. Twenty years later, the monks have aged, while the boy (Nitish Bhardwaj) and the girl (Pallavi Joshi) have grown and fall in love. The jealous monk deceitfully persuades the boy to become a monk, but the girl wins him back. As a result, both are expelled from the monastery, and that is when the sandstorm strikes once again.

Cast
 Nana Patekar as Uchanda
Pallavi Joshi as Iti
 Alok Nath as Thera
 Nitish Bharadwaj as Nirvana

Critical Reception 
Trishagni is also one of the films featured in Avijit Ghosh's book, 40 Retakes: Bollywood Classics You May Have Missed

References 

https://learningandcreativity.com/silhouette/trishagni-nabendu-ghosh/

External links
 
 
 Review Essay in Visual Anthropology

1988 films
Indian erotic films
Films based on short fiction
Films set in the 1st century BC
Films about Buddhism
1980s Hindi-language films
Films scored by Salil Chowdhury
Best Debut Feature Film of a Director National Film Award winners
1988 directorial debut films
Films based on works by Saradindu Bandopadhyay